Jevta Savić Čotrić (– 1821) was a Serbian politician and diplomat during the First Serbian Uprising and Second Serbian Uprising who served as a representative of the Zvornik nahiyah in the Cabinet of Matija Nenadović in 1805. He was the older cousin of Vuk Karadžić and with him, Vuk Karadžić "began to study books".

Biography
Jevta Savić Čotrić was an educated and respected man even before the uprising. With Anta Bogićević, and with Karađorđe's approval, he concluded a well-known contract with Mehmed-pasha Vidajić.

In 1807 he was elected a member of the Governing Council in Belgrade. Ivan Jugović opened the nucleus of what eventually became the Grandes écoles (Velika škola) in the fledgling premises of his big house. In 1812, he was appointed elder of Kladovo and Brza Palanka. He unsuccessfully negotiated peace with the Turks in 1813. In 1814, he "appeared before the Austrian emperor in Vienna with Archbishop Mateja Nenadović and prayed that any relief would be given to the people in Serbia."

He returned to Serbia in 1815 and settled in Šabac, where he died in 1821. He was buried in the family tomb at the Šabac cemetery. Vuk Karadžić wrote in his memoirs that Jevta was a far more accomplished writer than some of his contemporaries in the Governing Council.

Sources
 Milan Đ. Milićević, Pomenik znamenitih ljudi u srpskog narodu novijega doba, Vol 1 (Belgrade, 1888)
 Milan Đ. Milićević,Kneževina Srbija (Belgrade, 1878)
 Lazar Arsenijević Batalaka, Istorija srpskog ustanka (Belgrade, 1898)
 Konstantin N. Nenadović, Život i dela velikog Đorđa Petrovića Kara Đorđa Vrhovnog Vožda... (Vienna, 1884)
 Record of Karađorđe Petrović, Belgrade 1848;
 Record protocol of the letter priest Matija Nenadović on the war along the Drina in 1811, 1812, and 1813, Belgrade 1861;
 Memoirs of Matija Nenadović, Belgrade 1867;
 I. Stojšić, Jedna zaboravljena porodica, Naša nahija (almanah), Belgrade, 1926.

References 

1767 births
1821 deaths